Lucien Baroux (born Marcel Lucien Barou; 21 September 1888 in Toulouse – 21 May 1968 in Hossegor) was a French actor.  He began his career working in the theatre, moving on to a long career in films from the 1930s.

In the field of musical comedy he created roles in Brummell in 1931 (Jim), Déshabillez-vous ! in 1928 (Dumontel), Passionément in 1926 (Captain Harris), and J'adore ça in 1925 (Jacques Cocardier). He appeared as Laurent XVII in the 1935 film and 1956 recording of La mascotte.

He took part in the complete recording of Le Malade imaginaire (as Monsieur Diafoirus), in 1964 starring Michel Galabru on L'Encyclopédie Sonore Hachette.

Selected filmography 

 Monsieur le directeur (1925) - Ferdinand
 Son premier film (1926) - Le metteur en scène
 Tenderness (1930) - Carlos Jarry
 Levy and Company (1930) - Louis
 The Girl and the Boy (1931) - Le duc d'Auribeau
 La femme et le rossignol (1931)
 Un soir de rafle (1931) - Le Baron Stanislas
 Ronny (1931) - Theater director
 The Champion Cook (1932) - Lucien Dumorel
 You Will Be My Wife (1932) - Gustave Ménard
 Should We Wed Them? (1932) - Prof. Bock
 The Beautiful Adventure (1932) - Valentin Le Barroyer
 Le petit écart (1932) - Martial Hepmann
 La chanson d'une nuit (1933) - Pategg
 Une idée folle (1933) - Victor
 All for Love (1933) - Charlie
 Dream Castle (1933) - Ottoni, the camerman
 Charlemagne (1933) - L'auteur
 C'était un musicien (1933) - Théophile
 My Heart Is Calling You (1934) - Rosé - le directeur
 La garnison amoureuse (1934) - Le Colonel
 Ces messieurs de la Santé (1934) - Amédée
 La jeune fille d'une nuit (1934) - Antoine
 Night in May (1934) - Monsieur Stockel
 Maître Bolbec et son mari (1934) - Rébiscoul
 Le billet de mille (1935) - Le couturier
 Le Contrôleur des wagons-lits (1935) - Eugene Bernard, director of Jupiter automobiles
 Quelle drôle de gosse! (1935) - Alfred - le maître d'hôtel
 La Mascotte (1935) - Laurent XVII
 The Mysteries of Paris (1935) - Monsieur Pipelet
 Baccara (1935) - Charles Plantel
 Arènes joyeuses (1935) - Escopette
 Les soeurs Hortensia (1935) - Monsieur Marmoud
 La marraine de Charley (1936) - William
 Une fille à papa (1936) - Victor Dupuissol alias Sylvain de la Bretière
 Une gueule en or (1936) - Le marquis de Barfleur
 Forty Little Mothers (1936) - Prosper Martin
 Adventure in Paris (1936) - Raymond Sauvaget
 Messieurs les ronds de cuir (1936) - Lahrier
 L'ange du foyer (1937) - Le baron Sigismond des Oublies
 Le porte-veine (1937) - Julien
 Quatre heures du matin (1938) - Bidon Durand
 Monsieur Breloque a disparu (1938) - Monsieur Breloque
 Ma soeur de lait (1938) - Cyprien - le secrétaire de Jacques
 Un fichu métier (1938) - Le prince Alexis / Castin
 Remontons les Champs-Élysées (1938) - Le marquis de Chauvelin
 Behind the Facade (1939) - Le commissaire Boucheron
 Fire in the Straw (1939) - Antoine Vautier
 Miquette (1940) - Monchablon
 Moulin Rouge (1940) - Loiseau
 Chèque au porteur (1941) - Fortuné
 La femme que j'ai le plus aimée (1942) - Louis Drotort, le peintre
 Prince Charming (1942) - Ambroise Bréchaud
 The Guardian Angel (1942) - Duboin
 Soyez les bienvenus (1942) - Boisleroi
 Le grand combat (1942) - Victor
 La collection Ménard (1944) - Le conservateur du musée de mathématiques
 Échec au roy (1945) - Le jardinier La Verdure
 The French Way (1945) - Léon
 Sybille's Night (1947) - Chambon
 Naughty Martine (1947) - Le baron Saint-Yves
 Nine Boys, One Heart (1948) - Victor
 Brilliant Waltz (1949) - Monsieur DeBosc, impresario
 La ronde des heures (1950) - La Frite
 Prima comunione (1950) - Arcivescovo
 Banco de Prince (1950) - Hasdrubal - le chef de la sécurité
 Tapage nocturne (1951) - Armand Varescot
 Paris Still Sings (1951) - Clodomir
 Ils sont dans les vignes... (1952) - Le commissaire Desbordes
 Pleasures of Paris (1952) - Maroni
 Trois jours de bringue à Paris (1954) - Théophile Chambourcy, capitaine des pompiers
 Napoléon (1955) - Louis XVIII (uncredited)
 La villa Sans-Souci (1955) - Dr. Mallez
 Ces sacrées vacances (1956) - Le pêcheur
 Les carottes sont cuites (1956)
 Lovers and Thieves (1956) - Le médecin-chef de l'asile
 Les Truands (1957) - Le curé
 Les Misérables (1958) - Gillenormand
 Messieurs les ronds de cuir (1959) - Le père Soupe
 Le Diable et les Dix Commandements (1962) - Troussemier - l'évêque / The bishop (segments "Dieu en vain ne jureras" / "'Les Dimanches tu garderas")

References

External links 

1888 births
1968 deaths
French male film actors
French male silent film actors
French male stage actors
French male musical theatre actors
Male actors from Toulouse
20th-century French male actors
20th-century French male singers